Italian Community Bake Oven is a historic community bake oven located at Little Falls in Herkimer County, New York. It was built about 1891 and is abandoned. The utilitarian structure consists of a large rectangle of stone masonry outer walls enclosing the brick bake oven. The dimensions are approximately 16 feet wide, 20 feet deep, and 6 feet high. It was built to furnish large quantities of bread for Italian immigrant railroad workers in a work camp during 1891–1893.

It was listed on the National Register of Historic Places in 2006.

References

External links
Preserve Our Past website: Italian Community Bake Oven

Industrial buildings and structures on the National Register of Historic Places in New York (state)
Industrial buildings completed in 1891
Buildings and structures in Herkimer County, New York
National Register of Historic Places in Herkimer County, New York